The discography of South Korean girl group CLC consists of one single album, ten extended plays and fourteen singles.

Extended plays

Single albums

Singles

Soundtrack appearances

Compilation appearances

Collaborations

Music videos

Notes

See also
List of songs recorded by CLC

References

D
Discographies of South Korean artists
K-pop music group discographies